Lucky is an Indian television fantasy-drama series that aired on Star Plus from 4 November 2006 to 11 August 2007. The show is about a man named Lucky played by actor Gautam Rode and was produced by Sagar Arts Productions of Ramanand Sagar and directed by Nisser Parvej. It used to air every Saturday at 8 P.M. The show had hour-long episodes with each episode featuring different adventures of Lucky. It had Gautam Rode, Anang Desai and Navni Parihar playing regular roles. Amit Behl and Mouli Ganguly have also made episodic appearances in the show.baggi compounder

Plot

Lucky is a simple boy who lives with his mother in Mumbai. He runs a fake antique store. One day he finds out he is the fifth Rakshak (is supposed to protect antiques from being stolen). After that incident in every episode he goes on an adventure to save antiques with the help of Inder Mohan Sharma, Acharya Joshi (a 500-year-old friendly ghost), and Captain Paswan. Few months later, Lucky goes to protect people from dark powers and Supernatural Beings. He defeated powerful villains like Shivoren and Balthazar.

Cast
Main
 Gautam Rode as Lucky Singh

 Gyan Prakash Sharma as Inder Mohan Sharma
 Anang Desai as Acharya Joshi (Ghost)
 Navni Parihar as Lucky's Mother 
 Banwarilal Jhol as Captain Paswan
Guests
 Nirmal Pandey as Jaggani (Episode 10) / Balthazar (Episodes 21-26)
 Chetan Hansraj as Shivoren (Episodes 13-16)
 Manav Gohil as Professor Mohit Nanda (Episode 39)
 Manasi Varma as Uttara / Kaya Palat (Episode 05)
 Nigaar Khan as Sheena (Episode 08)
 Priya Wal as Tanu (Episode 1-2) / Sonia (Episodes 13-16)
 Rushali Arora as Chudail (Episode 19-20)
 Sujata Kumar as Ailya Devi (Episode 03)
 Aparna Tilak as Shakuntala Devi (Episode 06)
 Neetha Shetty as Mona Bakshi (Episode 10)
 Prachi Mehta as Eva (Episode 12)
 Amit Behl as Rajesh Singh, 4th Rakshak and Lucky's Father (Episode 01 in portray)
 Mouli Ganguly
 Soni Singh as Priya (Episode 21-23)
 Karishma Randhawa as Tara (Episode 23-25)
 Vinod Kapoor as Surana (Episode 22-24)
 Murali Sharma as Dara Mistri (Episode 04)
 Kunika as Vickina (Episode 04)
 Anisha Hinduja as Mayor (Episode 17-18)
 Dev Joshi
 Navina Bole as Shelly Pradhan (Episode 38)
 Akhil Mishra as Kaka (Episode 09) / Narka (Episode 13-14) / Balthazar's Henchman (Episode 21-26)
 KK Goswami as Phutke, Shivoren's Henchman (Episode 13-14)
 Kishwer Merchant as Sania (Episode 40)
 Simple Kaul as Gauravir aka Gauri (Episode 41)
 Shikha Singh as Evil Mother (Episode 31)
 Arup Pal as Sachin (Episode 31)
 Amit Singh Thakur as Siddhant Saxena (Episode 29)
 Vijay Ganju as Shantaram (Episode 06) / Guard of Trident (Episodes 14-15)
 Manish Wadhwa as General (Episode 36)
 Rajesh Khera as Dr. Anil Jaggi / Joker (Episode 38)
 Lalit Parimoo as Vikram (Episode 34)
 Ram Awana as Baba's henchman  (Episode 1-2)
 Shravani Goswami as Malti (Episode 29)

Episodes
 1. The Beginning
 2. Lucky Aur Maharana Ki Talwar
 3. Lucky Aur Umar Ki Teer
 4. Sone Ka Mahal
 5. Jujuba Ki Shrap
 6. Bhoot Daku
 7. Ghost Ship
 8. Good Bad and Lucky
 9. Laal Pathaar
 10. Amrit Kalash
 11. Heerabai
 12. Khushi Ka Phool
 13. Bhediya Part 1
 14. Bhediya Part 2
 15. Bhediya Part 3
 16. Bhediya Part 4 / Nagin Part 1
 17. Nagin Part 2
 18. Nagin Part 3
 19. Mannat Ka Kuan Part 1
 20. Mannat Ka Kuan Part 2
Rest of the Episodes are officially untitled.

References

External links

Indian television series
StarPlus original programming
2006 Indian television series debuts
2006 Indian television series endings